is a single-member constituency of the House of Representatives in the Diet of Japan. It is located in south-eastern Gunma and consists of Ota, Tatebayashi and Ōra County.

Areas Covered

Current District 
As of 24 January 2023, the areas covered by this district are as follows:

 Ōta
 Tatebayashi
 Ōra District

As part of the 2022 redistricting, the rest of Ota that was transferred back to the district from the 2nd district.

Areas from 2013-2022 
From the first redistricting in 2013, until the second redistricting in 2022, the areas covered by this district were as follows:

 Ōta (Excluding Yabuzukahon, Ojima and Nitta)
 Tatebayashi
 Ōra District

As part of the 2013 redistricting, the areas of Yabuzukahon, Ojima and Nitta were transferred to the 2nd district.

Areas from before 2013 
From the creation of the district in 1994, until the first redistricting in 2013, the areas covered by this district were as follows:

 Ōta
 Tatebayashi
 Nitta District
 Ōra District

Elected Representatives

Election Results

References

See also 

 List of districts of the House of Representatives of Japan

Gunma Prefecture
Districts of the House of Representatives (Japan)